Fu Caishu (born 12 November 1967) is a Chinese former competitive figure skater. She is the 1986 Fujifilm Trophy silver medalist and 1986 Asian Winter Games bronze medalist. She competed at the 1982 and 1983 World Junior Championships. After retiring from competition, she became a skating coach. She taught Zhu Qiuying and Yang Zhixue in Harbin. She has also coached Jin Boyang.

Competitive highlights

References 

1967 births
Chinese female single skaters
Chinese figure skating coaches
Living people
Figure skaters from Harbin
Asian Games medalists in figure skating
Figure skaters at the 1986 Asian Winter Games
Medalists at the 1986 Asian Winter Games
Asian Games bronze medalists for China